Sailor Moon Crystal, known as  in Japan, is a 2014 original net animation adaptation of the shōjo manga series Sailor Moon written and illustrated by Naoko Takeuchi and produced in commemoration of the original series' 20th anniversary. Directed by Munehisa Sakai at Toei Animation, written by Yūji Kobayashi, and character designed by Yukie Sakō, the first two seasons of the series were streamed worldwide on the Niconico website from July 5, 2014 to July 18, 2015, and the Blu-ray updated version aired on Japanese television (Tokyo MX) from April 6, 2015 to September 28, 2015. The 26 episodes covered the corresponding chapters of the re-release manga (Dark Kingdom and Black Moon arc). From episodes 1-26, the opening theme is "MOON PRIDE" while the ending theme is "Moonbow" both by Momoiro Clover Z.

In September 2015, Toei Animation announced that a third season was in production. The third season of Sailor Moon Crystal covered the Infinity arc of the manga. The third season was directed by Chiaki Kon, and character designed by Akira Takahashi. The first episode of the third season was previewed at the Animate Ikebukuro store in Tokyo on March 6, 2016. The third season consisted of 13 episodes and debuted on Japanese television (also on Tokyo MX) from April 4, 2016, to June 27, 2016. From episodes 27-39, the opening theme is "Fall in Love with the New Moon" by Etsuko Yakushimaru (ep 27–30, 39), Mitsuko Horie (ep 31–34), and Momoiro Clover Z (ep 35–38) while the ending themes are "Eternal Eternity" by Junko Minagawa and Sayaka Ohara (ep 27–30, 39), "Maiden's Advice" by Misato Fukuen (31–34), and "Only Eternity Ties Us Together" by Kenji Nojima (ep 35–38).

A sequel two-part anime film titled Pretty Guardian Sailor Moon Eternal The Movie, directed by Chiaki Kon at both Toei Animation and Studio Deen, written by Kazuyuki Fudeyasu, and character designed by Kazuko Tadano, was released in 2021, with the first film on January 8, and the second film on February 11. The films covered the Dream arc of the manga. The main theme for both films are "Moon Color Chainon", performed by Momoiro Clover Z with Sailor5Guardians, and the ending themes are "Wanting to be Together with You" by Yoko Ishida (first film), and "I'll Go as Myself" by ANZA (second film).

Another sequel two-part anime film titled Pretty Guardian Sailor Moon Cosmos The Movie, directed by Tomoya Takahashi at Toei Animation and Studio Deen, written by Fudeyasu and character designed by Tadano, is set to release in June 2023, with the first film on the 9th, and the second film on the 30th. The films will cover Stars arc of the manga.



Series overview

Episode list

Season 1: Dark Kingdom (2014)

Season 2: Black Moon (2015)

Season 3: Death Busters (2016)

Films

Home Media releases

Japanese
King Records released the first two seasons in 13 volumes on DVD and Blu-ray format.

Evil Line Records released 3 volumes of the third season in DVD and Blu-ray format.

English
Viz Media has licensed the series for release on DVD and Blu-ray format in North America. Madman Entertainment licensed the series for home video release in Australia and New Zealand.

Notes

References 

Sailor Moon Crystal
Episodes Crystal